Descendants is an American media franchise centered on a series of Disney Channel musical fantasy films directed by Kenny Ortega and created by Josann McGibbon and Sara Parriott.

The franchise takes place in a world that serves as a continuation of the Disney animated classic films. Starring Dove Cameron, Cameron Boyce, Sofia Carson and Booboo Stewart, each film chronicles the lives of the teenage children of four Disney Villains on the Isle of the Lost, and their move to the kingdom of Auradon at the request of the teenage son of Queen Belle and King Beast. The first film was released as a Disney Channel Original Movie in July 2015. Following its success, a sequel was put into production and premiered across six Disney-owned networks in July 2017. In August 2019, the third film premiered on Disney Channel. Each film was accompanied by original music; the soundtrack for the first film peaked at number one in the United States, the second peaked at number six, and the third peaked at number seven.

Film series

Descendants (2015)

Descendants premiered on July 31, 2015 on Disney Channel, and received immediate commercial success. Prior to its premiere, it was viewed more than one million times on the Disney Now app. On its premiere night, the film received 6.6 million viewers, becoming the most-watched broadcast on the network of 2015, and the highest-rated broadcast on the network since 2013. The film later went onto become the fifth most-watched original movie on cable television. The film's soundtrack debuted atop of the US Billboard 200, becoming the first Disney Channel original movie to do so since High School Musical 2 achieved the same feat in 2007.

In the United States of Auradon, Belle and Beast rule as king and queen, twenty years after they married, united the settings of many Disney animated films, and banished all villains to the Isle of the Lost, a slum surrounded by a magic-suppressing barrier. Beast plans to abdicate in favor of his and Belle's son, Ben, who announces a program to invite four children from the Isle of the Lost (dubbed as "Villains' Kids" or "VKs") to live in Auradon, away from the influence of their villainous parents: Carlos, son of Cruella de Vil; Jay, son of Jafar; Evie, daughter of the Evil Queen; and their gang's leader Mal, daughter of Maleficent. Maleficent orders them to steal the Fairy Godmother's magic wand and deactivate the barrier, so Maleficent can conquer Auradon. The four VKs find themselves fitting in and enjoying a normal childhood, and Mal begins a relationship with Ben, supplanting Audrey, daughter of Princess Aurora and Prince Phillip. When the barrier is inadvertently dispelled, Maleficent attacks Ben's coronation and transforms into a dragon.  With Ben encouraging her to make her own choice, Mal decides to be good. She and her friends rebuke Maleficent, turning her into a small lizard, from which state she can recover if she fills her heart with love. The people of Auradon celebrate.

Descendants 2 (2017)

Descendants 2 was announced on August 15, 2015, at the D23 Expo. The film premiered on July 21, 2017, and was simulcast on six channels: ABC, Disney Channel, Disney XD, Freeform, Lifetime, and Lifetime Movies. The film was watched by 5.3 million viewers on Disney Channel and 8.9 million across all six networks it is shown on.

Mal struggles with her new celebrity life as Ben's girlfriend, secretly using magic to maintain a lifestyle she feels is a façade. Mal decides that she does not belong in Auradon; she returns to the Isle, where gang leadership has fallen to her old rival, pirate captain Uma (Ursula's daughter), and her first and second mates, Harry (Captain Hook's son) and Gil (Gaston's son), respectively. Evie, Jay, and Carlos agree to help Ben find Mal, but Mal rejects Ben, believing it to be best for him and Auradon that she stays on the Isle. Uma captures Ben and demands the Fairy Godmother's wand in exchange for his life. Uma resents not being chosen to live in Auradon; Ben respects her as a leader and invites her to Auradon, but she vows to make her own way there instead. Using a 3D-printed decoy wand, Mal's group rescues Ben. At the shipboard royal cotillion, Uma appears as Ben's date and he announces he will destroy the barrier; Mal realizes Uma has cast a spell on Ben. When Mal discovers Ben commissioned a portrait that depicts her as she was before she changed herself with magic, she accepts the act of love and kisses Ben, breaking the spell. Uma and Mal battle, transforming into an octopus and a dragon, respectively. Ben tries to negotiate with Uma, but she leaves, unreconciled. Evie asks to bring more children from the Isle to Auradon and Ben agrees.

Descendants 3 (2019)

Descendants 3 was announced on February 16, 2018. The film premiered on August 2, 2019 on Disney Channel. The film received 4.6 million viewers on its premiere night.

Ben proposes to Mal, making her the future queen of Auradon. However, threats from Uma, Mal's father Hades and Ben's ex-girlfriend Audrey has Mal trying to stop evil once and for all. While Mal, Evie, Jay and Carlos are recruiting a new generation of villain kids, Hades is trying to breach through the barrier, then Audrey steals Maleficent's crown and the scepter and becomes an evil version of herself. The VKs return to the Isle of the Lost on a mission to retrieve Hades' ember and later, Uma, Harry and Gil team up with Mal and the others to stop Audrey from destroying Auradon.

The Pocketwatch and potential sequels 

In September 2021, Deadline Hollywood reported that two more Descendants films were being developed by Disney.

On May 10, 2022, a new sequel, titled Descendants: The Pocketwatch, was greenlit for Disney+, with Jennifer Phang attached to direct. It centers on Red, the teenage daughter of the Queen of Hearts, and Chloe, the daughter of Cinderella and Prince Charming, teaming up and traveling back in time to prevent a catastrophic event. On September 11, 2022, the fourth sequel, now being referred to as Descendants 4, was announced to star China Anne McClain, who is returning to portray Uma, with Kylie Cantrall (as Red) and Dara Reneé (as Ulyana) joining the cast of the film. In November 2022 being referred to as The Pocketwatch again, Rita Ora (as Queen of Hearts), Brandy (as Cinderella), Malia Baker (as Chloe), Ruby Rose Turner (as Bridget), Morgan Dudley (as Ella), and Joshua Colley (as Hook) joined the cast with Melanie Paxson returning as Fairy Godmother.

Cast members

Discography

Soundtrack albums

Singles

Promotional singles

Other charted songs

Other appearances

Music videos

Television series

Prequel spin-off

Before the film's premiere air date, Disney Channel announced a live action mini series leading up to the event. Every day leading up to the release of the film, a new episode of Descendants: School of Secrets would be released revealing more secrets about the students at Auradon Prep. Each episode of the series is under 5 minutes long, with 23 episodes in total.

Animated spin-off

Right after the film finished airing on Disney Channel, it was announced that a CGI-animated short spinoff entitled Descendants: Wicked World would be released on September 18, 2015. Furthermore, former Phineas and Ferb storyboard artist Aliki Theofilopoulos Grafft announced on Twitter that she was directing the series, with Jenni Cook as producer, and that the original cast would be reprising their roles.

The Planning of the Royal Wedding
On November 6, 2020, an animated short prequel of the Descendants: The Royal Wedding television special was released on Disney Channel's YouTube channel. The series follows Mal and Evie as they prepare for the royal wedding with Dove Cameron and Sofia Carson reprising their roles.

Short films

Under the Sea: A Descendants Short Story (2018)
A short film, Under The Sea: A Descendants Short Story was released on September 28, 2018. The story revolves around Mal (Dove Cameron), who discovers a glowing orb in a forest. She then meets Dizzy (Anna Cathcart), who is wearing a necklace that is possessed by Uma (China Anne McClain).

Audrey's Royal Return: A Descendants Short Story (2019)
A second short film, Audrey's Royal Return: A Descendants Short Story, was released on July 5, 2019. It centers on Audrey (Sarah Jeffery), who stops by her salon for a makeover in preparation for her comeback at Auradon after her absence the previous year, summarising the events of the first two films from her point of view while also explaining her absence in the second film.

Wicked Woods: A Descendants Halloween Story (2019)
A stop motion animation short film Wicked Woods: A Descendants Halloween Story, was released on October 4, 2019. The story revolves around Mal (Dove Cameron) who tells her friends on Halloween night, about the legend of the Headless Horseman, one of Auradon's first villains, who is said to be lost in the woods of the city and has haunted them for hundreds of years. The shorts was animated using dolls from the Descendants toy line with Dove Cameron, Sofia Carson, Booboo Stewart, Cameron Boyce (Posthumously), Sarah Jeffery and China Anne McClain reprising their roles.

Television special: Descendants: The Royal Wedding (2021)
Descendants: The Royal Wedding is an animated special that aired on Disney Channel on August 13, 2021. This is the first Descendants project to be announced after Boyce's death, and as such, it was reported that the absence of Carlos would be addressed. In the film, Mal actually says she misses Carlos.

Disney's Descendants: The Musical 
On February 6, 2020, Music Theatre International released the rights to a junior production of the film series. The plot mostly follows that of the first film but uses elements from the sequel and music from all three films and Descendants: Wicked World. It features a book and additional lyrics are written Nick Blaemire, additional music by Madeline Smith, and new orchestrations by Matthew Tishler.

Novels

The Isle of the Lost series
This book series details events that take place during the three movies.

The Isle of the Lost
A prequel novel called The Isle of the Lost by Melissa de la Cruz, has the villains' descendants banding together to retrieve the Dragon's Eye. The book was released on May 5, 2015. The book has spent over 14 weeks as a Children's Middle Grade New York Times Best Seller.

Besides detailing about the children of Maleficent, Jafar, Cruella De Vil, and the Evil Queen, it also talks about some of the known locations of the Isle of the Lost like Dragon Hall (the only school on the Isle of the Lost), Goblin Wharf (which is operated by goblins who would like amnesty for their involvement with Maleficent), Bargain Castle (which sells enchanted robes and bargain hats while the top floor is where Maleficent lives), Jafar's Junk Shop (which is owned by Jafar as mentioned in the film), Castle Far Away (where the Evil Queen lives), Hell Hall (where Cruella de Vil lives), and the Isle of the Doomed (which is hidden next to the Isle of the Lost). The sorcerer Yen Sid from Fantasia is positioned here by King Beast to work at Dragon Hall to help the students with formerly magical parents adapt to more modern methods since the Isle of the Lost's barrier negates all magic.

Other villains mentioned or hinted to be on the Isle of the Lost are Captain Hook from Peter Pan (who is mentioned to own "Hook's Inlet and Shack" and is the father of Harriet), Ursula from The Little Mermaid (who owns "Ursula's Fish and Chips" while the Strait of Ursula that's named after her is what separates the Isle of the Lost from Charmington), Dr. Facilier from The Princess and the Frog (who was the founder of Dragon Hall), Mother Gothel from Tangled (who is mentioned to be a teacher at Dragon Hall teaching "Selfishness 101" and is the mother of Ginny Gothel), Lady Tremaine and her two daughters Drizella and Anastasia from Cinderella (also Anastasia is the mother of Anthony, Lady Tremaine a teacher at Dragon Hall teaching "Evil Schemes and Nasty Plots" while her cat Lucifer is the school mascot), Clayton from Tarzan (who is the father of Clay Clayton), Madam Mim from The Sword in the Stone (who has Mad Maddy as one of her granddaughters), Governor John Ratcliffe from Pocahontas, Gaston from Beauty and the Beast (who is mentioned to be the father of Gaston Jr and Gaston III, as well as the owner of "Gaston Duels Without Rules"), Shan Yu from Mulan, Shere Khan from The Jungle Book (who owns "Shere Khan Pawns"), Scar and his hyena cronies from The Lion King, the Coachman from Pinocchio (who operates a taxicab pulled by normal donkeys after spending a year rounding up the boys he had turned into donkeys), the Horned King from The Black Cauldron (who is mentioned to own "Cauldron Repair"), Professor Ratigan from The Great Mouse Detective, Yzma from The Emperor's New Groove (who is the mother of Yzla), and Claude Frollo from The Hunchback of Notre Dame (who is mentioned to own "Frollo's Creperie" and is the father of Claudine Frollo). The Isle of the Lost novel also mentioned an original character who was the former Royal Astronomer of Agrabah and an ally of Jafar who is the father of Reza.

Return to the Isle of the Lost
Another Descendants novel titled Return to the Isle of the Lost was released on May 24, 2016. While Ben is running Auradon while his parents are on a cruise, Mal, Jay, Carlos, and Evie receive threatening messages to return to the Isle of the Lost at the time when it ends up in worse shape ever since Maleficent's defeat and the fact that Cruella de Vil, the Evil Queen, and Jafar have gone missing.

During this time, it was confirmed that the Crocodile from Peter Pan (who has various children swimming around "Hook's Inlet and Shack", which is Captain Hook's store), Edgar Balthazar from The Aristocats (who is mentioned to have a son named Eddie), Hades from Hercules (who is mentioned to have a son named Hadie), and the Ringmaster from Dumbo (who is mentioned to have a daughter named Hermie Bing) are also imprisoned on the Isle of the Lost. It also introduces Hercules's son Herkie, Pinocchio's son Pin, Grumpy's son Gordon, Tiger Lily's daughter Tiger Peony, and King Arthur's son Artie in the book.

Also as Freddie, Jordan, and Ally appear in the book, the story takes place during Descendants: Wicked World.

Rise of the Isle of the Lost
A prequel novel called Rise of the Isle of the Lost was released on May 23, 2017. The novel details Uma's rise to power and her earlier history with Mal. The main plot details Uma planning to get the migrating trident of King Triton in order to help bring down the barrier surrounding the Isle of the Lost.

In addition to the mentioning of Genie, Grumpy, and Merriwether being teachers at Auradon Prep, a third school called the Serpent Preparatory School for the Education of Miscreants is located on the Isle of the Lost which Uma, Harry Hook, and Gil attended. Serpent Prep is a rival of Dragon Hall.

The book also introduced Yen Sid's Auradon intern Sophie, Ariel's niece Arabella, and Mulan and Shang's son Li'l Shang who is Lonnie's brother. There was a mentioning that the Stabbington brothers from Tangled are also on the Isle of the Lost where they have children called the Stabbington Cousins. Other information listed here that was later referenced in the film was Audrey and Chad breaking up, the introduction of R.O.A.R., Mal keeping Maleficent's lizard form as a pet, and Evie having her magic mirror placed in the museum.

Escape from the Isle of the Lost
The fourth book in the series was published on June 4, 2019. Hades' minions Pain and Panic are confirmed to be on the Isle of the Lost.

School of Secrets

School of Secrets is a series of novels that serve as a continuation of the Descendants film. The first book, CJ's Treasure Chase, was released on August 30, 2016 and centers on Captain Hook's daughter, CJ Hook. The second book, Freddie's Shadow Cards, was released on November 1, 2016, and centers on Freddie, the daughter of Dr. Facilier. The third book, Ally's Mad Mystery, was released on February 28, 2017 and focuses on Ally, the daughter of Alice in Wonderland. The fourth novel, Lonnie's Warrior Sword, was released on August 25, 2017, and will focus on Lonnie, the daughter of Mulan and Li Shang, while the fifth book, Carlos's Scavenger Hunt, was released on November 14, 2017.

Junior novelization
A junior novelization of the film Descendants, adapted by Rico Green, was published on July 14, 2015, a junior novelization of the film Descendants 2, and a junior novel of Descendants 3 was published on July 30, 2019.

Other books
Other books have been released, including Mal's Diary, Mal's Spell Book 1 and 2, Evie's Fashion Book, Uma's Wicked Book, Audrey's Diary, The Villain Kids’ Guide for New VKs, The Magic of Friendship, a poster book, a Descendants 3 sticker and activity book, and a Guide to Auradon Prep. All of which were published under Disney Publishing Worldwide.

See also 
 List of Descendants characters

Notes

References

 
Disney Channel Original Movie films
Mass media franchises introduced in 2015